Below are the squads for the 2012 Toulon Tournament. Each team had to submit 20 players.

Group A

Egypt

Head coach: Hany Ramzy

Japan

Head coach: Takashi Sekizuka.

Netherlands

Head coach: Adrie Koster

Turkey A2

Head coach: Gökhan Keskin

Group B

Belarus

Head coach: Georgi Kondratiev

France

Head coach: Francis Smerecki

Mexico

Head coach: Luis Fernando Tena

Morocco

Head coach:  Pim Verbeek

Footnotes

Toulon Tournament squads
Squad